The 1908 U.S. Open was the fourteenth  U.S. Open, held August 27–29 at Myopia Hunt Club in South Hamilton, Massachusetts, northeast of Boston. Fred McLeod defeated 1899 champion Willie Smith in an 18-hole playoff to win his only major title.

High winds on Thursday caused scores in the first two rounds to soar, with only two players managing to break 80. Willie Smith carded rounds of 77-82 for a three-stroke lead over Myopia club pro John Jones, with brother Alec Smith four back and Fred McLeod five behind.

On Friday, Smith struggled to an 85 in the third round in the morning but still held the lead by one over McLeod and two over Alex. In the final round that afternoon, McLeod tied for lowest score of the tournament by carding a 77, while Smith managed a 78 to force a playoff.

In the playoff on Saturday, McLeod and Smith were even through 13 holes, but McLeod took the lead at the 14th after Smith missed a par putt. McLeod dominated the rest of the way, going 1-under on the last five holes to shoot a 77 to Smith's 83. McLeod only broke 80 in one round of the tournament, while Smith and Gilbert Nicholls were the only players to shoot in the 70s twice. The winning score of 322 was the third-highest in U.S. Open history.

Past champions in the field 

Source:

Did not play: Harry Vardon (1900), Fred Herd (1898), James Foulis (1896).

Round summaries

First round
Thursday, August 27, 1908 (morning)

Source:

Second round
Thursday, August 27, 1908 (afternoon)

Source:

Third round
Friday, August 28, 1908 (morning)

Source:

Final round
Friday, August 28, 1908 (afternoon)

Source:

Amateurs: Travis (347), Hylan (356), J. Anderson (357).

Playoff
Saturday, August 29, 1908

Source:

References

External links
USGA Championship Database

U.S. Open (golf)
U.S. Open (golf)
U.S. Open
U.S. Open (golf)
Golf in Massachusetts
Hamilton, Massachusetts
Events in Essex County, Massachusetts
Sports competitions in Massachusetts
Sports in Essex County, Massachusetts
Tourist attractions in Essex County, Massachusetts
U.S. Open (golf)